Zigano is a 1925 French-German silent historical adventure film directed by Gérard Bourgeois and Harry Piel and starring Piel, Denise Legeay and Dary Holm. It premiered in Berlin on 27 July 1925.

Cast

References

Bibliography

External links

1925 films
1920s historical adventure films
German historical adventure films
French historical adventure films
Films of the Weimar Republic
German silent feature films
French silent feature films
Films directed by Harry Piel
Napoleonic Wars films
Bavaria Film films
Gaumont Film Company films
German black-and-white films
French swashbuckler films
German swashbuckler films
Silent historical adventure films
1920s French films
1920s German films
1920s German-language films
German-language French films